Echinoteuthis is a genus of whip-lash squid containing approximately three to five species. Some teuthologists consider Idioteuthis synonymous with this taxon.

The genus contains bioluminescent species.

Species
According to the World Register of Marine Species the genus Echinoteuthis contains three species:

Echinoteuthis atlantica (Joubin, 1933)
Echinoteuthis danae Joubin, 1933
Echinoteuthis famelica (Berry, 1909)

However, the Tree of Life Project lists the following species in Echinoteuthis:

Echinoteuthis atlantica (Joubin, 1933)
Echinoteuthis glaukopis Chun, 1908
Echinoteuthis famelica (Berry, 1909)
Echinoteuthis danae Joubin, 1933
Echinoteuthis tyroi * Salcedo-Vargas, 1997

The species listed above with an asterisk (*) is a taxon inquirendum and needs further study to determine if it is a valid species or a synonym.

References

External links

Squid
Cephalopod genera
Bioluminescent molluscs